Arturo Tedeschi (born 24 April 1979) is an Italian architect, computational designer and writer. He's the founder of the architecture practice and design consulting A>T which promotes a new kind of algorithmic-based design. His work includes techniques such as Algorithms-Aided Design (AAD), CNC milling, robotic milling, 3D printing, artificial intelligence, virtual reality. Arturo Tedeschi is the author of the books: Architettura Parametrica, Parametric Architecture with Grasshopper and AAD Algorithms-Aided Design, a reference book on algorithmic modelling based on the Grasshopper platform.

Career 
Arturo Tedeschi started his career in 2004, combining professional practice in Italy with a personal research on algorithms-aided design, focusing on relationships between architecture and emerging technologies. In 2010 he published Architettura Parametrica, a technical book on computational design translated into English as Parametric Architecture with Grasshopper. In the same year he worked at Zaha Hadid Architects in London. in 2011 he founds the office A>T starting an activity both as a designer and consultant (architecture, furniture, fashion, footwear, automotive). Among his projects: NU:S Installation at Chiostro Del Bramante (Roma, 2012), Parametric Shoes (Roma, 2012) where 3D printing has been applied to fashion design, The CloudBridge (2013), Ilabo Shoes with Ross Lovegrove (Milano, 2015), In-Formation with Ross Lovegrove (Koln, 2017), Needle Watch (2017), Transmission at Victoria and Albert Museum with Ross Lovegrove (London, 2017), Fessura wall system (Milano, 2017), Alcantara Corner Lounges for Audi with Lovegrove and Colombo (Milano, 2017), Oyster Chair (Milano, 2018), Iris Concept Car (2020), Passerella, a new tram for Milano (2020), HorizON suspension lamp for the Venice Glass Week 2020. In 2014 he published AAD Algorithms-Aided Design. In 2019 he has been appointed Italian Design Ambassador for the Sydney Design festival within the Italian Design Day 2019

Teaching 
Arturo Tedeschi has been an invited lecturer at universities and conferences. He taught and lectured at Politecnico di Milano, Architectural Association School of Architecture in London,  ISCTE-IUL Lisbon, University of Sydney, Dubai Institute of Design and Innovation, University of Edinburgh, IUAV Venezia, University of Arkansas Rome Center, Universidad Europea (Madrid).

Writings 

 2014  AAD Algorithms-Aided Design, Parametric Strategies using Grasshopper, Edizioni Le Penseur, 
 2011 Parametric Architecture with Grasshopper, Edizioni Le Penseur, 
 2010 Architettura Parametrica – Introduzione a Grasshopper (II edizione italiana), Edizioni Le Penseur, 
 2010 Architettura Parametrica – Introduzione a Grasshopper (I edizione italiana), Edizioni Le Penseur,

References

External links 
 Official website
 interview on FORBES
 Interview: Arturo Tedeschi
Intervista: Arturo Tedeschi: il BIM per reinterpretare in chiave innovativa
Iris Concept Car on Trendhunter
Recensione AAD Algorithms Aided Design di Arturo Tedeschi 

1979 births
3D printing specialists
Living people
Italian designers
21st-century Italian architects